Emanuel Bilbao (born 3 November 1989) is an Argentine professional footballer who plays as a goalkeeper for Instituto.

Club career
After a stint with Almaceneros, Bilbao joined Olimpo. Despite being a first-team member between 2008 and 2014, he didn't make a senior appearance for the club across seasons in the Primera División and Primera B Nacional. During his time with Olimpo, Bilbao had separate loan spells with Liga de Fútbol de Río Colorado outfit Independiente. On 11 February 2015, Bilbao joined Guillermo Brown of Primera B Nacional. He was an unused substitute forty-one times in 2015, before making his professional bow in April 2016 against Instituto. A further twenty-eight appearances in all competitions followed across the next three campaigns.

In June 2018, fellow second tier team Quilmes signed Bilbao. His debut arrived on 27 August against Atlético de Rafaela.

International career
Bilbao received a call-up from Sergio Batista to train with the Argentina U20s in 2008.

Career statistics
.

References

External links

1989 births
Living people
People from Coronel Pringles
Sportspeople from Buenos Aires Province
Argentine footballers
Association football goalkeepers
Primera Nacional players
Olimpo footballers
Guillermo Brown footballers
Quilmes Atlético Club footballers
Club Atlético Alvarado players
Villa Dálmine footballers
Instituto footballers